Bertil Sundberg (July 7, 1907, Stockholm – July 20, 1979, Stockholm) was a Swedish chess player.

Biography
In 1938 Bertil Sundberg won the first Swedish Correspondence Chess Championship. He repeated this success two more times (1943, 1947).

He represented Sweden and won an individual bronze medal at second reserve board (+10 −4 =1) in the 3rd unofficial Chess Olympiad held at Munich in 1936.

References

External links
 
 

1907 births
1979 deaths
Sportspeople from Stockholm
Swedish chess players
Chess Olympiad competitors
20th-century chess players